Ohangaron is a district of Tashkent Region in Uzbekistan. The capital lies at the city Ohangaron, itself not part of the district. The district consists of 4 urban-type settlements (Yon-ariq, Qora Xitoy, Telov, Eyvalek) and 8 rural communities (Uvaq, Birlik, Doʻstlik, Qurama, Qora xitoy, Ozodlik, Susam, Telov).

References

Districts of Uzbekistan
Tashkent Region